John William Allen (August 24, 1802October 5, 1887) was an American lawyer and politician from Ohio. He served two terms in the United States House of Representatives from 1837 to 1841 and also served as the fourth Mayor of Cleveland.

Early life and career
John W. Allen was born in Litchfield, Connecticut in 1802. He was the son of Representative John Allen. He attended preparatory schools and moved to Chenango County, New York in 1818. He received a classical education and studied law.

Allen moved to Cleveland, Ohio in 1825, and studied law under judge Samuel Cowles and became a leader of the bar. He was president of the village from 1831 to 1835, a member of the board of directors of the Commercial Bank of Lake Erie in 1832, and one of the incorporators of the Cleveland and Newburgh Railroad Company in 1834.

Congress 
Allen was an organizer of the Ohio Railroad in 1836, and served in the Ohio State Senate 1836–37. He was elected to the 25th and 26th Congresses as a Whig, and served March 4, 1837 – March 3, 1841. He was elected Mayor of Cleveland in 1841.

Later career and death 
In 1845, Allen was elected president of the Cleveland, Columbus and Cincinnati Railroad, and was a delegate to the first convention on river and harbor improvement, held in Chicago in 1847. When the Whig party dissolved in the 1850s, he joined with the Republicans. He was appointed postmaster of Cleveland April 4, 1870, by President Grant, and was re-appointed in 1874, serving until he resigned January 11, 1875.

He died in Cleveland on October 5, 1887, and was interred at Erie Street Cemetery.

See also
List of railroad executives

References

External links

 

|-

|-

Mayors of Cleveland
Republican Party Ohio state senators
Politicians from Litchfield, Connecticut
1802 births
1887 deaths
19th-century American railroad executives
Whig Party members of the United States House of Representatives from Ohio
19th-century American politicians
Burials at Erie Street Cemetery